Tutto l'amore che c'è (All the Love There Is) is a 2000 film by Italian director Sergio Rubini. It stars Damiano Russo, Michele Venitucci and, in a cameo role, Gérard Depardieu.

Synopsis

Set in the 1970s, the film depicts Italian youths experiencing the sexual revolution of the previous decade, whilst addressing differences between Italy's southern and northern regions.

Cast

 Damiano Russo: Carlo De Vito
 Michele Venitucci: Nicola
 Francesco Cannito: Enzo Garofalo
 Sergio Rubini: Carlo's Father
 Margherita Buy:  Marisa
 Teresa Saponangelo: Maura
 Vittoria Puccini: Gaia
 Gérard Depardieu: Molotov
 Mariolina De Fano: Zia Rosa

Production
Vittoria Puccini recalled that her first take was a sex scene and the second one was a nude scene on the male star's lap.

References

External links

 

2000 films
2000 drama films
Italian drama films
2000s Italian-language films
Films directed by Sergio Rubini
Films set in the 1970s